The Order Police battalions were militarised formations of the German Order Police (uniformed police) during the Nazi era. During World War II, they were subordinated to the SS and deployed in German-occupied areas, specifically the Army Group Rear Areas and territories under German civilian administration. Alongside detachments from the Einsatzgruppen and the Waffen-SS, these units perpetrated mass murder of the Jewish population and were responsible for large-scale crimes against humanity targeting civilian populations.

Operational history
The German Order Police was a key instrument of the security apparatus of Nazi Germany. In the prewar period, Heinrich Himmler, the head of the SS, and Kurt Daluege, chief of the Order Police, cooperated in transforming the police force of the Weimar Republic into militarised formations ready to serve the regime's aims of conquest and racial annihilation. The police units participated in the annexation of Austria and the occupation of Czechoslovakia.

Invasion of Poland

Police troops were first formed into battalion-sized formations for the invasion of Poland, where they were deployed for security and policing purposes, also taking part in executions and mass deportations. The first 17 battalion formations were deployed by Orpo in September 1939 along with the Wehrmacht in the invasion of Poland. The battalions guarded Polish prisoners of war and carried out expulsion of Poles from Reichsgau Wartheland under the banner of Lebensraum. They also committed atrocities against both the Catholic and the Jewish populations as part of those "resettlement actions". After hostilities had ceased, the battalions−such as Reserve Police Battalion 101−took up the role of security forces, patrolling the perimeters of the Jewish ghettos in German-occupied Poland (the internal ghetto security issues were managed by the SS, SD, and the Criminal Police, in conjunction with the Jewish ghetto administration).

Invasion of the Soviet Union
Twenty-three Orpo battalions were slated to take part in the 1941 invasion of the Soviet Union, Operation Barbarossa. Nine were attached to the Wehrmacht security divisions. Two battalions were assigned to support the Einsatzgruppen, the mobile death squads of the SS, and the Organisation Todt, the military construction group. Twelve were formed into regiments, three battalions each, and designated as Police Regiments Centre, North, South, and Police Regiment Special Purpose. The goals of the police battalions were to secure the rear by eliminating the remnants of the enemy forces, guarding the prisoners of war, and protecting the lines of communications and captured industrial facilities. Their instructions also included, as Daluege stated, the "combat of criminal elements, above all political elements".

Comprising about 550 men each, the 300-numbered battalions were raised from recruits mobilised from the 1905–1915 year groups. They were led by career police professionals, steeped in the ideology of Nazism, driven by anti-semitism and anti-Bolshevism. The regiments and battalions were placed under the command of career policemen. When the units crossed the German-Soviet border, they came under the control of the Higher SS and Police Leader (HSS-PF) for the respective Army Group Centre Rear Areas.

Occupied Western and Southern Europe

Units

Regular police battalions
 Police Battalion 9 (attached to Einsatzgruppen)
 Police Battalion 45
 Police Battalion 303
 Police Battalion 304
 Police Battalion 307
 Police Battalion 309
 Police Battalion 314
 Police Battalion 315
 Police Battalion 316
 Police Battalion 320
 Police Battalion 322

Reserve police battalions
Reserve Police Battalion 101

Aftermath
The Order Police as a whole had not been declared a criminal organisation by the Allies, unlike the SS, and its members were able to reintegrate into society largely unmolested, with many returning to police careers in Austria and West Germany.

References

Bibliography

Further reading
 

 

1939 establishments in Germany
1941 establishments in Germany
The Holocaust in Belarus
The Holocaust in Poland
The Holocaust in Russia
The Holocaust in Ukraine
SS and Police units